Dangun or Dangun Wanggeom was the legendary founder and god-king of Gojoseon, the first Korean kingdom, around present-day Liaoning province in Northeast China and the northern part of the Korean Peninsula. He is said to be the "grandson of heaven" and "son of a bear", and to have founded the kingdom in 2333 BC. The earliest recorded version of the Dangun legend appears in the 13th-century Samguk Yusa, which cites China's Book of Wei and Korea's lost historical record Gogi (lit. 'Ancient Record') (고기). However, it has been confirmed that there is no relevant record in the China's Book of Wei. There are around seventeen religious groups that focus on the worship of Dangun.

Koreans regard the day when Dangun founded Gojoseon, Korea's first dynasty, as a national holiday and call it Gaecheonjeol (개천절; 開天節). The Gaecheonjeol is 3 October. It is a religious anniversary started by Daejonggyo (대종교; 大倧教) worshipping Dangun. Gaecheonjeol is a day to commemorate Dangun's founding of Gojoseon, but 3 October is not actually the date when Gojoseon was founded.

Many Korean historians regard Dangun and Tengri as being etymologically identical.

The mythical record and its interpretation 

Dangun's ancestry legend begins with his grandfather Hwanin (환인/), the "Lord of Heaven". Hwanin had a son, Hwanung (환웅/ Hanja: 桓雄), who yearned to live on the earth among the valleys and the mountains. Hwanin permitted Hwanung and 3,000 followers to descend onto Baekdu Mountain, where Hwanung founded the Sinsi (신시/ Hanja: 神市, "City of God"). Along with his ministers of clouds, rain and wind, he instituted laws and moral codes and taught humans various arts, medicine, and agriculture. Legend attributes the development of acupuncture and moxibustion to Dangun.

A tiger and a bear prayed to Hwanung that they might become human. Upon hearing their prayers, Hwanung gave them twenty cloves of garlic and a bundle of mugwort, ordering them to eat only this sacred food and remain out of the sunlight for 100 days. The tiger gave up after about twenty days and left the cave. However, the bear persevered and was transformed into a woman. The bear and the tiger are said to represent two tribes that sought the favor of the heavenly prince.

The bear-woman, Ungnyeo, (Hangul;) was grateful and made offerings to Hwanung. However, she lacked a husband, and soon became sad and prayed beneath a  "divine birch" tree to be blessed with a child. Hwanung, moved by her prayers, took her for his wife and soon she gave birth to a son named Dangun Wanggeom.

Dangun ascended to the throne, built the walled city of Asadal situated near Pyongyang (the location is disputed), and called the kingdom Joseon—referred to today as Gojoseon "Old/Ancient Joseon" (고조선, Hanja: 古朝鮮) so as not to be confused with the later kingdom of Joseon (조선, Hanja: 朝鮮) that was established roughly 2000 years later. He then moved his capital to Asadal on Mount Paegak or Mount Gunghol.

Dangun's biography reflected the interest of the people of Dangun Joseon (Gojoseon) at the time in establishing the legitimacy of the kingship of Gojoseon and the dignity of the country. The king of Gojoseon conducted a ritual in honor of his ancestral god every year. Soon, the myth of Dangun was the political ideology of the Gojoseon period, and the ritual had a function of political assembly.

Dating 
Emperor Dangun's rule is usually calculated to begin in 2333 BCE, based on the description of the Dongguk Tonggam (1485) contrary to the 40th year of the reign of the legendary Chinese Emperor Yao. Other sources vary somewhat, but also put it during Yao's reign (traditional dates: 2357 BC-2256 BC). The Samguk Yusa states Dangun ascended to the throne in the 50th year of Yao's reign, while Annals of the Joseon Dynasty says the first year and Dongguk Tonggam says the 25th year.

Until 1961, the official South Korean era (for numbering years) was called the Dangi, which began in 2333 BC. Followers of Daejongism considered 3 October in the Korean calendar as Gaecheonjeol ( "Festival of the Opening of Heaven"). This day is now a public holiday in South Korea in the Gregorian calendar called "National Foundation Day". North Korea dates Dangun's founding of Gojoseon to the early 30th century BC.

15 March in the year 4340 of the Dangun Era is called "Royal Day Festival" (hangul: 어천절 hanja:  romaja: eo-cheon-jeol), the day that the semi-legendary founder Dangun returned to the heavens.

Historical perception 

Dangun began to attract attention during the late Goryeo dynasty, when Koreans fought wars against the Mongolian Yuan dynasty. During the Joseon dynasty they were worshiped as the ancestors of the nation. In the Joseon dynasty, a shrine dedicated to Dangun of Gojoseon and King Dongmyeong of Goguryeo was built in Pyongyang, and the Samseongdang (삼성당/三聖堂), dedicated to the gods of Hwanin, Hwanung, and Dangun, was built.

In Korea at the end of the 19th century, it was greatly emphasized to highlight the resistance of the Joseon people against Imperialist invasion, and it developed into a religion, Dangunkyo (단군교/檀君敎). Dangun, who emerged as the central figure of nationalism, played a large role in the spiritual foundation of the independence movement during the Japanese colonial period. In addition, the history of the Dangun era was compiled by Daejonggyo (대종교) powers such as 'Daedong Sagang (대동사강)' and 'Gyuwon Sahwa (규원사화)' and the independence movement, emphasizing the history of the Dangun period.

The study of Dangun in South Korea focused on the historical significance of the Gojoseon society. In South Korea, Dangun Wanggeom is regarded as the head of the Gojoseon society, with many characteristics of the role of high priest. Wanggeom has the meaning of an overlord who governs the country.

In North Korea, the Dangun and Dangun myths were previously established as the founding myth to justify the process of establishing the Gojoseon regime. However, after the excavation of the Mausoleum of Tangun in 1994, he changed his position and claimed that the Dangun myth reflects historical facts and that Dangun is a real person. Also, Dangun claims that the first king of Gojoseon, founded by the Korean people, had all of his birth, founding, and tombs in Pyongyang. There is a tomb of Dangun that North Korea excavated and reconstructed near the city directly under Pyongyang.

Appearances 

The earliest recorded version of the Dangun legend appears in the 13th century Samguk Yusa (삼국유사/ Hanja: 三國遺事), which cites China's Book of Wei and Korea's lost history text Gogi. This is the best known and most studied version, but similar versions are recorded in the Jewang Un-gi (제왕운기/ Hanja: 帝王韻紀) by the late Goryeo scholar Yi Seunghyu (이승휴/ Hanja: , 1224–1300), as well as the Eungje Siju (응제시주/ Hanja: 應製詩註) and Sejong Sillok (세종실록; commonly known as "Annals of the Joseon Dynasty", Sejong Jang-heon Dae-wang Shil-lok 세종장헌대왕실록/ Hanja: 世宗莊憲大王實錄) of the early Joseon. Dangun is worshipped today as a deity by the followers of Cheondoism and Daejongism.

In Taekwondo
Dangun is the second pattern or hyeong in the International Taekwon-Do Federation form of the Korean martial art taekwondo. Students learn that the hyeong represents "the holy legendary founder of Korea in the year 2333 BC." Unusually for a hyeong, all the punches in Dan Gun are high section (eye level) symbolising Dangun scaling a mountain (see Dangun Hyeung).

Mausoleum of Dangun 

North Korea's leader Kim Il-sung insisted that Dangun was not merely a legend but a real historical person. As a consequence, North Korean archaeologists were compelled to locate the purported remains and grave of Dangun.

According to a publication by North Korea, the Mausoleum of Dangun is the alleged burial site of the legendary Dangun. The site occupies about 1.8 km² (0.70 mi²) on the slope of Taebaek Mountain in Kangdong, not to be confused with the Taebaek Mountain in South Korea. Dangun's grave is shaped like a pyramid, about 22 m (72 ft) high and 50 m (164 ft) on each side.

See also 
 History of Korea
 List of monarchs of Korea
 List of people of Korean descent
 List of national founders

References

Further reading

External links 
 The Legend of Tan-Gun
 Myth of Korea: Tangun
 Korean Myths and Tales
 The T'angun Legend
 Korean Tales in French

Mythological kings
 
Gojoseon rulers
Hongik Ingan
Korean mythology
Korean gods
Mountain gods
Founding monarchs
Legendary progenitors
Legendary monarchs